Sumgayit FK is an Azerbaijani professional football club based in Sumqayit.

This list encompasses the major records set by the club and their players in the Azerbaijan Premier League. The player records section includes details of the club's goalscorers and those who have made more than 50 appearances in first-team competitions.

Player

Most appearances 

Players played over 50 competitive, professional matches only. Appearances as substitute (goals in parentheses) included in total.

Overall scorers 

Competitive, professional matches only, appearances including substitutes appear in brackets.

Internationals

This is a list of all full international footballers to play for Sumgayit FK. Players who were capped while a Sumgayit player are marked in bold. Players who gained their first International cap after leaving Sumgayit are not included.

Current players

Former players

Team

Record wins
Record win: 4–0 
v Turan Tovuz, 2012–13 Azerbaijan Premier League , 11 March 2013 
Record League win: 4–0 
v Turan Tovuz, 2012–13 Azerbaijan Premier League , 11 March 2013
Record Azerbaijan Cup win: 2–0 
v Lokomotiv-Bilajary, 26 October 2011 
Record away win: 2–3 
v Ravan Baku, 2012–13 , 16 December 2012 
Record home win 4–0 
v Turan Tovuz, 2012–13 Azerbaijan Premier League , 11 March 2013

Record defeats
Record defeat: 1–8 
v Neftchi Baku, 2012-13 Azerbaijan Premier League, 17 November 2012 
Record League defeat: 1–8 
v Neftchi Baku, 2012-13 Azerbaijan Premier League, 17 November 2012
Record away defeat: 1–8 
v Neftchi Baku, 2012-13 Azerbaijan Premier League, 17 November 2012
Record Azerbaijan Cup defeat: 0–3
v Qarabağ, 2011-12 Azerbaijan Cup, 30 November 2011 
Record home defeat: 1–6 
v Qarabağ, 2012-13 Azerbaijan Premier League, 19 August 2012

Wins/draws/losses in a season
 Most wins in a league season: 9 – 2012–13
 Most draws in a league season: 8 – 2012–13
 Most defeats in a league season: 20 – 2011-12
 Fewest wins in a league season: 6 – 2011-12
 Fewest draws in a league season: 6 – 2011-12
 Fewest defeats in a league season: 15 – 2012–13

Goals
 Most League goals scored in a season: 32 – 2012–13
 Most Premier League goals scored in a season: 31 – 2012–13
 Fewest League goals scored in a season: 29 – 2011–12
 Most League goals conceded in a season: 52 – 2011–12
 Fewest League goals conceded in a season: 49 – 2012–13

Points
 Most points in a season:
35 in 32 matches, Azerbaijan Premier League, 2012-13
 Fewest points in a season:
24 in 32 matches, Azerbaijan Premier League, 2011-12

References

Sumgayit FK
Sumgayit FK